Heinrich Schweiger (23 July 1931 – 14 July 2009) was an Austrian film and stage actor who played leading roles at the Burgtheater on the Ring beginning in 1949. Among the plays in which he starred were Schiller's Don Carlos, Shakespeare's Othello and Richard III and Kurt Weill's The Threepenny Opera.

The actor's last roles were in Wallenstein, Franz Lehár's Das Land des Lächelns and in an ORF TV series.

Biography 
After studying at the Max Reinhardt Seminar, Schweiger debuted at the Burgtheater at the age of 18. His breakthrough role came at the age of 22 in Arthur Schnitzler's Komtesse Mizzi.

He had roles in the 1960s at the Freien Volksbühne in Berlin under Erwin Piscator and the city's Theater am Kurfürstendamm under Leonard Steckel. In the 1970s he played at the Thalia Theater in Hamburg under Boy Gobert.

Schweiger also took on the roles of the devil and mammon for 12 years in Jedermann at the Salzburg Festival and had guest roles at the Akademietheater and the Perchtoldsdorf Summer Festival.

The actor also had roles in the TV series Kommisar Rex and Ringstraßenpalais, in the films Franz Schubert – ein Leben in zwei Sätzen and Der Bockerer, and worked with the Austrian filmmaker Franz Antel.

Schweiger successfully portrayed a variety of characters with leading roles in world literature and at the same time been at home in Vienna coffee-house literature.

Schweiger married former MEP and current Vienna first district leader Ursula Stenzel in 1983. It was his third marriage. He died after suffering circulatory failure and a cerebral haemorrhage.

An amateur photographer, Schweiger released the photobook Images of an Actor, which was a collection of photographs started in 1983.

Awards 
 Kammerschauspieler
 Kainz Medal
 Austrian Cross of Honour for Science and Art, 1st class
 Gold Medal of Vienna
 Honorary membership of the Burgtheater
 Honorary title of Professor (2003)

Filmography

1950s 
A Night in Venice ( Komm in die Gondel) (1953) as Enrico
Franz Schubert (1953) as Franz Schubert
Das Licht der Liebe (1954) as Paul Zeller
The Beautiful Adventure ( Das schöne Abenteuer) (1959) as César

1960s 
Jedermann (1961) as Der Teufel
Becket oder Die Ehre Gottes (1962, TV Movie) as Der König
 ( Die ihre Haut zu Markte tragen) (1962, Austria) as Klamm
Elf Jahre und ein Tag ( Eleven Years and One Day, International: English title) (1963) as Stumpf
Professor Bernhardi (1964, TV Movie) as Hofrat Dr. Winkler
Der rasende Reporter – Egon Erwin Kisch ( Der rasende Reporter (West Germany: short title)) (1967, TV Movie) as Egon Erwin Kisch
Postlagernd Opernball – Die Affäre Redl (1967, TV Movie) as Egon Erwin Kisch
Tragödie auf der Jagd (1968, TV Movie) as Graf
Frau Wirtin hat auch einen Grafen ( Sexy Susan Sins Again (UK: dubbed version) (US)  A fogadósnénak is van egy (Hungary)  Oui à l'amour, non à la guerre (France)  Susanna... ed i suoi dolci vizi alla corte del re (Italy)) (1968) as Napoleon
Frau Wirtin hat auch eine Nichte ( House of Pleasure (UK) (US: video title)  Il trionfo della casta Susanna (Italy)) (1969) as Napoleon Bonaparte

1970s 
Das Bastardzeichen ( Bend Sinister (International: English title)) (1970, TV Movie) as Paduk
Jedermann (1970, TV Movie) as Mammon
Ein gebildeter Hausknecht (1970, TV Movie) as Knitsch
Change (1971, TV Movie) as Antoine
Trotta (1971) as Vater Kovacs
Die heilige Johanna (1971, TV Movie) as Erzbischof von Reims
Die Abenteuer des braven Soldaten Schwejk (1972, TV Series) as Bretschneider
 ( Was geschah auf Schloß Wildberg?) (1972) as Revierinspektor Bröschl
 (1972) as Professor Rodenburg
 ( Le eccitanti guerre di Adeline (Italy)  War Is Hell (US)  War Is War (International: English title)  Wie bitte werde ich ein Held? (West Germany)) (1972) as Pavel
My Daughter, Your Daughter (1972) as Polizeihauptmann Rausch
Cry of the Black Wolves (1972) as Sam Jenkins
Briefe von gestern (1972, TV Movie) as Josef Uhlier
Blue Blooms the Gentian (1973) as Hans-Karl 'Hazy' Morton
Crazy – Completely Mad ( Rudi, laß das Mausen sein) (1973) as Abdullah
 ( Dream City (US)  Dream Town) (1973) as Mr. Gautsch
Zwei im siebenten Himmel ( Two in Seventh Heaven) (1974) as Oskar Ritz
Verurteilt 1910 (1974, TV Movie) as Max Winter
Übernachtung in Tirol (1974, TV Movie) as Strupp
Tatort (1975–1987, TV Series) as Peischl / Enzo Neumeier / Königsmann / Tornay
 (1976) as Mr. Dobermann
 ( The Elixirs of the Devil) (1976) as the Pope
The Man in the Rushes (1978) as Mostbaumer
 (1978, TV Mini-Series) as Sameschkin
Iphigenia auf Tauris (1978, TV Movie)
Die großen Sebastians (1979, TV Movie) as General Zadok

1980s 
Georg Friedrich Händels Auferstehung (1980, TV Movie)
Ringstraßenpalais (1981–1983, TV Series) as Eduard Baumann
 ( Der Rächer vom Schallerhof) (1982) as J.B. Mayer
 (1982, TV Movie) as Peter Wallace
Milionite na Privalov ( Милионите на Привалов (Bulgaria: Bulgarian title)  Privalov's Millions (Europe: English title)) (1983, TV Series)
The Devil's Lieutenant (1984, TV Movie) as Colonel Imstadt
Flucht ohne Ende (1985, TV Movie) as Iwan
Echo Park (1985) as August's father
Erdsegen ( Blessings of the Earth (US)) (1986, TV Movie) as Dr. von Stein
 (1987) as Arthur / Otto Weigand
Heiteres Bezirksgericht (1988, TV Series)

1990s 
Die Kaffeehaus-Clique (1990, TV Movie)
Strauss Dynasty (1991, TV Mini-Series)
The Mixer (1992, TV Series)
Kommissar Rex (1994–2005, TV Series) as Bruno Walter / Bruno Landovsky
The Broken Jug (1995, TV Movie)
Ein Richter zum Küssen (1995, TV Movie)
Der Bockerer 2 (1996) as Major Franz Nowotny
Der Unfisch (1997) as Herr Fink
Die Schuld der Liebe (1997) as Dr. Bredow 
Schlosshotel Orth (1999, TV Series)

2000s 
Der Bockerer III – Die Brücke von Andau (2000) as Oberst Novotny
Edelweiss (2001, TV Movie) as Erich Dorfmeister
Ein Hund kam in die Küche (2002, TV Movie) as Vater Blum
Der Bockerer IV – Prager Frühling (2003) as Novotny
Der Winzerkönig (2006, TV Series) as Eudard Stickler (final appearance)

References

External links 
 

Austrian male stage actors
1931 births
2009 deaths
Male actors from Vienna
Austrian male film actors
Austrian male television actors
20th-century Austrian male actors
21st-century Austrian male actors
Recipients of the Austrian Cross of Honour for Science and Art, 1st class